Quentin Roosevelt I (November 19, 1897 – July 14, 1918) was the youngest son of President Theodore Roosevelt and First Lady Edith Roosevelt. Inspired by his father and siblings, he joined the United States Army Air Service where he became a pursuit pilot during World War I. He was killed in aerial combat over France on Bastille Day (July 14), 1918. He is the only child of a U.S. president to have died in combat.

Early life

Childhood

Quentin was born in Washington, D.C., the youngest child of Theodore Roosevelt's household, which included half-sister Alice, sister Ethel, and brothers Ted (Theodore III), Kermit, and Archie.

Quentin was three years old when his father became president, and he grew up in the White House. By far the favorite of all of President Roosevelt's children, Quentin was also the most rambunctious.

Quentin's behavior prompted his mother, Edith, to label him a "fine bad little boy". Amongst Quentin's many adventures with the "White House Gang" (a name assigned by T.R. to Quentin and his friends), Quentin carved a baseball diamond on the White House lawn without permission, defaced official presidential portraits in the White House with spitballs, threw snowballs from the White House's roof at unsuspecting Secret Service guards, and occasionally rode on top of the family elevator with his friend, Charlie Taft, the son of Secretary of War and future President William Howard Taft. The Secret Service were alarmed to see a fire and smoke behind the White House, only to see Quentin with a makeshift brick stone baking some potatoes.

He quickly became known for his humorous and sometimes philosophical remarks. To a reporter trying to trap the boy into giving information about his father, Quentin admitted, "I see him occasionally, but I know nothing of his family life." The family soon learned to keep him quiet during dinner when important guests were present.

Once, when his brother Archie was terribly ill, it was Quentin (with the help of Charles Lee, a White House coachman) who brought the pony Algonquin to his room by elevator, sure that this would make his brother smile.

Education

Quentin started his education at Force Elementary School and then attended the Episcopal High School in Alexandria, Virginia.  Later he was a student at the Evans School for Boys and Groton School.

Quentin consistently scored high marks and displayed the intellectual prowess of his father. He was admitted to Harvard University in 1915. By the time Quentin was a sophomore at Harvard, also like his father, he was showing promise as a writer. Quentin was posthumously awarded an A.B. (War Degree) by Harvard, Class of 1919.

Personal life

Quentin was engaged to Flora Payne Whitney, the elder daughter of Harry Payne Whitney and Gertrude Vanderbilt. Gertrude was a great-granddaughter of the shipping and railroad millionaire, "Commodore" Cornelius Vanderbilt. Harry objected to Flora's relationship with Quentin because Harry disapproved of the Roosevelt family in general and the liberal Republican Theodore Roosevelt in particular.

Quentin's letters to Flora and his father charted the course of America's entry into the war. While Theodore and Quentin were initially neutral, Theodore was incensed over the sinking of the British passenger ship RMS Lusitania in May 1915, in which 128 Americans drowned. Theodore campaigned vigorously on behalf of the 1916 Republican Presidential nominee, Charles Evans Hughes, during which he severely criticized Woodrow Wilson.  Wilson was subsequently reelected on a neutrality platform, but took the country to war during his second term.

Quentin came to agree with his father, writing to Flora in early 1917 from Harvard University, where he was studying: "We are a pretty sordid lot, aren't we, to want to sit looking on while England and France fight our battles and pan gold into our pockets."

Military service

All the Roosevelt sons had military training prior to World War I. With the outbreak of war in Europe in August 1914, there was a heightened concern about the nation's readiness for military engagement. Only the month before, Congress had belatedly recognized the significance of military aviation by authorizing the creation of an Aviation Section in the Signal Corps. In 1915, Major General Leonard Wood, a friend of Theodore Roosevelt since the Rough Rider days, organized a summer camp at Plattsburgh, New York, to provide military training for business and professional men at their own expense. It would be this summer training program that would provide the basis of a greatly expanded junior officers corps when the country entered World War I. During August 1915, many well-heeled young men from some of the finest East Coast schools, including Quentin Roosevelt and two of his brothers, attended the camp.  When the United States entered the war, commissions were offered to the graduates of these schools based on their performance. The National Defense Act of 1916 continued the student military training and the businessmen's summer camps and placed them on a firmer legal basis by authorizing an Officers' Reserve Corps and a Reserve Officers' Training Corps (ROTC). Quentin, just out of the rigors of Groton and Harvard, did not really enjoy the training, but stuck it out anyway.

After the declaration of war, when the American Expeditionary Force was organizing, Theodore wired Major General John J. Pershing and volunteered to form a division and have his sons accompany him to Europe as privates. Pershing, who was a friend of Roosevelt dating back to the Cuban campaign, and had served under him when T.R. was president, accepted the proposal, but the War Department and President Woodrow Wilson overrode the decision. Roosevelt took the issue to Congress, but Wilson prevailed. In the end, all four of Theodore's sons served in World War I as officers, but Theodore spent the war making speeches for the Red Cross.

With American entry into World War I, Quentin thought his mechanical skills would be useful to the Army.  Just engaged to Flora, he dropped out of college in May 1917 to join the newly formed 1st Reserve Aero Squadron, the first air reserve unit in the nation.  He trained on Long Island at an airfield later renamed Roosevelt Field in his honor. Today, a shopping mall sits on the site that is also named Roosevelt Field.

Air service in France

Finally sent to France, Lieutenant Roosevelt first helped in setting up the large Air Service training base at Issoudun.  He was a supply officer and then, in time, ran one of the training airfields. Eventually, he became a pilot in the 95th Aero Squadron, part of the 1st Pursuit Group. The unit was posted to Touquin, France and, on July 9, 1918, Saints, France. During the time that he was flying from Saints, he was billeted just half a mile away at Melina Thibault's home in Mauperthuis, France where he roomed with supply officer Ed Thomas. Roosevelt had one confirmed kill of a German aircraft, which he shot down on July 10, 1918. Four days later, in a massive aerial engagement at the commencement of the Second Battle of the Marne, he was himself shot down behind German lines.

Captain Eddie Rickenbacker, commander of the 94th Aero Squadron (also known as the "Hat-in-the-Ring" Squadron), in his memoirs described Roosevelt's character as a soldier and pilot in the following words:

Quentin's plane (a Nieuport 28) was shot down in aerial combat over Chamery, a hamlet of Coulonges-en-Tardenois (now Coulonges-Cohan). He was felled by two machine gun bullets which struck him in the head. The German military buried him with full battlefield honors. Since the plane had crashed so near the front lines, they used two pieces of basswood saplings, bound together with wire from his Nieuport, to fashion a cross for his grave. For propaganda purposes, they made a postcard of the dead pilot and his plane. However, this was met with shock in Germany, which still held Theodore Roosevelt in high respect and was impressed that a former president's son died on active duty. According to his service record, the site was at Marne Grave #1 Isolated Commune #102, Coulongue Aisne. The French government posthumously awarded him the Croix de Guerre with Palm.

Final combat flight and death

Three German pilots have been credited with Quentin's shootdown and death at various times, and all three of them may have been his killer. Leutnant Karl Thom of Jasta 21, one of the greatest German flying aces of the war, was in the vicinity and had confirmed kills nearby; he was often credited with Quentin's downing, but never claimed the kill. Lt
Leutnant Christian Donhauser of Jasta 17 claimed credit and publicized himself as Quentin's killer after the war. Sergeant Carl Graeper of Jasta 50 also claimed credit, but if he did fire the fatal shots, it was his only kill during the war. All three of them may have been in the dogfight which claimed Quentin's life.

In 1921, Quentin's brother Kermit edited and published Quentin Roosevelt: A Sketch with Letters, consisting of Quentin's letters from France as well as tributes to Quentin written after his death. Pages 169–171 describe the circumstances of Quentin's last flight and death. On that page is a letter home from another American pilot, Lieutenant Edward Buford, detailing Quentin's final mission. Buford, like Quentin, was also reported as missing in action, but he managed to land safely at a French aerodrome. He had witnessed Quentin's last fight from the air, and described it to his family several months later:

Kermit continued:

Not long afterward, a German official bulletin was found on a prisoner:

At the time of a struggle between a German Pursuit squadron of seven aircraft and twelve American pursuit aviators above the Marne, a fight took place between the German pursuit pilot, a non-commissioned officer Greper, and an American pilot.  After a long fight, the German flyer succeeded in bringing down his gallant antagonist.

The hostile airman had been killed by two bullets in the head.  He was identified by his papers as Lieutenant Roosevelt, of the U.S.A. Flying Corps.

A clipping from the Kölnische Zeitung obtained through the Spanish Embassy gave this account of the fight:

The aviator of the American Squadron, Quentin Roosevelt, in trying to break through the airzone over the Marne, met the death of a hero. A formation of seven German airplanes, while crossing the Marne, saw in the neighborhood of Dormans a group of twelve American fighting airplanes and attacked them. A lively air battle began, in which one American (Quentin) in particular persisted in attacking. The principal feature of the battle consisted in an air duel between the American and a German fighting pilot named Sergeant Greper.  After a short struggle, Greper succeeded in bringing the brave American just before his gun-sights. After a few shots the plane apparently got out of his control; the American began to fall and struck the ground near the village of Chamery, about ten kilometers north of the Marne.  The American flier was killed by two shots through the head.  Papers in his pocket showed him to be Quentin Roosevelt, of the United States army.  His effects are being taken care of in order to be sent to his relatives. He was buried by German aviators with military honors. The German pilot who shot down Quentin Roosevelt told me of counting twenty bullet holes in his machine when he landed after the fight. He survived the war but was killed in an accident while engaged in delivering German airplanes to the American Forces under the terms of the Armistice.

Funeral services held by the Germans were witnessed on July fifteenth by Captain James E. Gee of the 110th Infantry, who had been captured and was being evacuated to the rear. Captain Gee passed through Chamery, the little village near which the plane crashed to earth. He thus describes the scene:

In a hollow square about the open grave were assembled approximately one thousand German soldiers, standing stiffly in regular lines. They were dressed in field gray uniforms, wore steel helmets, and carried rifles.  Near the grave was a smashed plane,  and beside it was a small group of officers, one of whom was speaking to the men. "I did not pass close enough to hear what he was saying; we were prisoners and did have the privilege of lingering, even for such an occasion as this.  At the time I did not know who was being buried, but the guards informed me later. The funeral certainly was elaborate. I was told afterward by Germans that they paid Lieut. Roosevelt such honor not only because he was a gallant aviator, who died fighting bravely against odds, but because he was the son of Colonel Roosevelt whom they esteemed as one of the greatest Americans.

On July 18, in a great allied counter-attack, the village where Quentin fell was retaken from the Germans, and his grave was found by some American soldiers.  At its head was a wooden cross, on which was printed:

	Leutnant Q. Roosevelt
	Honored and Buried by the Imperial German Army.

Following the custom that sprang up in the heroic soil of the air-service, the broken propeller-blades and bent and scarred wheels of the plane were marking his resting-place.

Near by lay the shattered remains of the airplane, with the seventy-six "wound stripes" which Quentin had painted on it, still to be seen.

The engineer regiment of the division that had retaken Chamery marked the spot where the airplane fell, and raised a cross at the grave with the inscription

The French placed an oaken enclosure with a head-born reading:

After his grave came under Allied control, thousands of American soldiers visited it to pay their respects. Quentin's resting place became a shrine and an inspiration to his comrades in arms. Quentin's death was a great personal loss to his father, who understood quite well that he had encouraged his son's entry into the War. It is said that he never fully recovered from Quentin's death. Within six months, Theodore himself would be dead.

In 1955, eleven years after the World War II American Cemetery was established in France at Colleville-sur-Mer, Quentin's body was exhumed and moved there. Quentin's remains were moved in order to be buried next to his eldest brother Ted, who had died of a heart attack in France in 1944, shortly after leading his troops in landings on Utah Beach on D-Day as Assistant 4th Infantry Division Commander (an act which would earn him the Medal of Honor). Quentin's original gravestone was moved to Sagamore Hill to serve as a cenotaph for the President's son. The German-made basswood cross that marked Quentin's original gravesite is on display at the National Museum of the United States Air Force, at Wright-Patterson Air Force Base, in Dayton, Ohio.

A young Quentin Roosevelt and his father, President Theodore Roosevelt, are mentioned in the 1953 children's story book Brighty of the Grand Canyon on the occasion of Quentin's first mountain lion hunt.

Commemorations
In June 2007, several Roosevelt family members as well as members of the Theodore Roosevelt Association (TRA) visited the small monument in France at the French village over which Quentin was shot down in 1918. Their purpose was to restore the monument and prepare a report to the TRA on the work accomplished by this trip.

Quentin Roosevelt II (1919–1948), the third and youngest son of Ted, was named after Quentin, and also died in a plane crash.

On July 14, 2008, on the 90th anniversary of Quentin's death, the villages of Saints, Mauperthuis and Touquin held a commemoration of Quentin Roosevelt. Roosevelt was billeted in the village of Mauperthuis and based in Saints at the time of his death.

On Sainte-Marie-à-Py the Aux Morts des Armées de Champagne monument was made in 1923 by sculptor Maxime Real del Sarte.

On June 28, 2009, on the 90th anniversary of the departure of the USAS from Issoudun, Issoudun held a ceremony in honor of the American aviators and also included Quentin Roosevelt's name on the new plaque.

The community of Quentin, Pennsylvania, in Lebanon County, was named for Quentin Roosevelt.

There is a street in Château-Thierry, France named rue Quentin Roosevelt in his honor. Château-Thierry held a series of events and exhibitions in honor of the memory of Quentin Roosevelt in 2010.

Quentin Road in Brooklyn, New York, originally called Avenue Q, was renamed in 1922, possibly in honor of Quentin Roosevelt.

Garden City, New York has a Quentin Roosevelt Boulevard. Its Roosevelt Field – formerly an airfield and now site of Roosevelt Field Mall – was named for Quentin Roosevelt.

The French village Sancy-les-Cheminots in Aisne remembers Quentin Roosevelt in its Jardin de souvenir (Garden of remembrance). Formerly Sancy, this village was completely destroyed and has been rebuilt by donations of the railway workers (fr:cheminots) and of American donors, among them Mme Theodore Roosevelt and Mme Emily Carow, godmother of Quentin Roosevelt.

Quentin Roosevelt Blvd. on Naval Air Station (NAS) North Island, San Diego, CA is named in his honor.

See also
 Roosevelt family

References

External links

The Almanac of Theodore Roosevelt
USAF Museum
Photos of the First Pursuit Group
Captain Eddie Rickenbacker's Account of Quentin's Death during World War I
 Nine American Squadrons, Online French & English Account of US Army Air Corps Ops in France. German propaganda photo of Quetin's body beside his crashed airplane
July 14, 2008 Commemoration of Quentin Roosevelt and 1st Pursuit Group
Theodore Roosevelt Digital Library at the Theodore Roosevelt Center at Dickinson State University
Historic film footage of Captain Quentin Roosevelt during World War I period. View from 2:07 to end of clip.
Historian David Pietrusza discusses Quentin Roosevelt's death on the occasion of its Centenary – C-SPAN

Literature 
 Eric Burns: The golden Lad; the haunting Story of Quentin and Theodore Roosevelt. Pegasus Books, New York, 2016, 

1897 births
1918 deaths
Harvard University alumni
American military personnel killed in World War I
American people of Dutch descent
American people of Scotch-Irish descent
American people of Scottish descent
Aviators killed by being shot down
Bulloch family
Children of presidents of the United States
Children of vice presidents of the United States
Episcopal High School (Alexandria, Virginia) alumni
Groton School alumni
Quentin Roosevelt
Schuyler family